Count  was a Japanese politician and imperial court official. As Lord Keeper of the Privy Seal of Japan, Makino served as Emperor Hirohito’s chief counselor on the monarch’s position in Japanese society and policymaking. In this capacity, he significantly contributed to the militarization of Japanese society by organizing support for ultranationalist groups and swaying Hirohito to sanction the Imperial Army’s unauthorized aggression in China. Even after his retirement in 1935, he remained a close advisor to the throne through the end of World War II in 1945.

Early life and education 
Born to a samurai family in Kagoshima, Satsuma Domain (present day Kagoshima Prefecture), Makino was the second son of Ōkubo Toshimichi, but adopted into the Makino family at a very early age. 
In 1871, at age 11, he accompanied Ōkubo on the Iwakura Mission to the United States as a student, and briefly attended school in Philadelphia.  After he returned to Japan, he attended Tokyo Imperial University, but left without graduating.

Career 

Upon beginning his career as a diplomat, Makino was assigned to the Japanese Embassy in London. There, he made the acquaintance of Itō Hirobumi. Following his service abroad, he served as governor of Fukui Prefecture (1891–1892) and Ibaraki Prefecture (1892–1893). He resumed his career in diplomacy as an Ambassador to Italy (1897–1899) and later Ambassador to the Austro-Hungarian Empire and Switzerland.
 In March 1906, Makino was appointed Minister of Education under Prime Minister Saionji Kinmochi. While serving in the 1st Saionji Cabinet, he was elevated in rank to danshaku (baron) under the kazoku peerage system. When Saionji began his second term as Prime Minister on 30 August 1911, Makino again joined his Cabinet as Minister of Agriculture and Commerce. He was also appointed to serve on the Privy Council. Over the course of his political career, he aligned his policies closely with Itō Hirobumi and later, with Saionji, and was considered one of the early leaders of the Liberalism movement in Japan.

After victory in World War I, Makino was appointed to be one of Japan's ambassador plenipotentiaries to the Paris Peace Conference of 1919, headed by the elder statesman, Marquis Saionji. At the conference, he and other members of the delegation put forth a racial equality proposal that did not pass.

On September 20, 1920, he was awarded the Grand Cordon of the Order of the Rising Sun with Paulownia Flowers. In February 1921, he became Imperial Household Minister and elevated in rank to shishaku (viscount). Behind the scenes, he strove to improve Anglo-Japanese and Japanese-American relations, and he shared Saionji Kinmochi's efforts to shield the Emperor from direct involvement in political affairs.

In 1925, he was appointed Lord Keeper of the Privy Seal of Japan. In his efforts to preserve the monarchy’s exalted status, Makino increasingly positioned himself alongside Japan’s ultranationalist movement. In 1928, he oversaw the organization of nationwide enthronement ceremonies that energized the cult of personality surrounding Emperor Hirohito. He also authorized royal support for radical right wing groups and counseled Hirohito to legitimize the Army’s illegal invasion of China. In this manner, he played a central role in fueling militarism within Japan in the 1930s.

On May 15, 1932, Makino's residence got attacked by ultra nationalist League of Blood, but Nobuaki didn't get hurt. It was part of the May 15 Incident.

In 1935, he relinquished his position as Lord Keeper and was elevated in the title to hakushaku (count). Although he formally retired his positions in 1935, his relations with Hirohito remained good, and he still had much power and influence behind the scenes. This made him a target for radicals in the Japanese military. He only narrowly escaped assassination at his villa in Yugawara during the February 26 Incident in 1936. He continued to be an advisor and exert a moderating influence on the Emperor until the start of World War II.

Later life and death

Makino was also the first president of the Nihon Ki-in Go Society, and a fervent player of the game of go.

After the war, his reputation as an "old liberalist" gave him high credibility, and the politician Ichirō Hatoyama attempted to recruit him to the Liberal Party as its chairman. However, Makino declined for reasons of health and age. He died in 1949, and his grave is at the Aoyama Cemetery in Tokyo.

Personal life 
Noted post-war Prime Minister Shigeru Yoshida was Makino's son-in-law. One of his grandchildren Ken'ichi Yoshida was a literary scholar. The former Prime Minister, Tarō Asō, is Makino's great-grandson. His great-granddaughter, Nobuko Asō, married Prince Tomohito of Mikasa, a first cousin of Emperor Akihito. In addition, Ijūin Hikokichi, the former minister of foreign affairs, was the brother-in-law of Makino.

Honours 
 1925: Grand Cordon Order of Leopold.
 1930: Grand Cross of the Order of the White Lion

Notes

Resources
 Agawa, Hiroyuki. The Reluctant Admiral: Yamamoto and the Imperial Navy. Kodansha International (2000). 
 Beasley, W. G. Japanese Imperialism 1894–1945. Oxford University Press. 
 Wetzler, Peter. "Hirohito’s First Adviser: Count Makino Nobuaki." in Hirohito and War (University of Hawaii Press, 1998) pp . 139-178.
 Makino, Nobuaki. Makino Nobuaki nikki. Chūō Kōronsha (1990).  (Japanese)

External links

1861 births
1949 deaths
People from Satsuma Domain
People from Kagoshima
Politicians from Kagoshima Prefecture
Kazoku
People of Meiji-period Japan
University of Tokyo alumni
Education ministers of Japan
Foreign ministers of Japan
Government ministers of Japan
Governors of Fukui Prefecture
Governors of Ibaraki Prefecture
Recipients of the Order of the Rising Sun
Ambassadors of Japan to Austria-Hungary
Ambassadors of Japan to Italy
20th-century diplomats